Greniera is a genus of flies belonging to the family Simuliidae.

The species of this genus are found in Europe and Northern America.

Species:
 Greniera abdita (Peterson, 1962) 
 Greniera abditoides (Wood, 1963)

References

Simuliidae
Chironomoidea genera